Michael James Holligan (16 September 1881 – 3 February 1948) was an Australian rules footballer who played with Geelong in the Victorian Football League (VFL).

Notes

External links 

1881 births
1948 deaths
Australian rules footballers from Victoria (Australia)
Geelong Football Club players
Barwon Football Club players